Tentax malleus is a moth of the family Erebidae first described by Michael Fibiger in 2011. It is found in Indonesia (it was described from northern Sumatra).

The wingspan is 10-11.5 mm. The head, labial palps, patagia, thorax, tegulae and forewing (including fringes) are beige and reddish brown. The basal costal patch and upper quadrangular medial area of the forewing are blackish brown, the latter inside with a black dot. The abdomen is reddish brown. The crosslines are reddish brown, including the subterminal area and terminal line. The hindwings are grey. The underside of the forewings is light brown and the underside of the hindwings is grey with a discal spot.

References

Micronoctuini
Taxa named by Michael Fibiger
Moths described in 2011